Kendall Terrace is an ice-free volcanic ash terrace extending along the northwestern side of Deception Island, in the South Shetland Islands. It was named by the UK Antarctic Place-Names Committee in 1957 for Lieutenant Edward N. Kendall, Royal Navy, the surveyor on HMS Chanticleer, who made the first survey of Deception Island in January–March 1829.

References

Terraces of Antarctica
Geography of Deception Island